Theodore John Nolan (born April 7, 1958) is an Indigenous Canadian former professional hockey left winger, former head coach of the Buffalo Sabres and Latvia men's national ice hockey team. From July 2017 until May 2018 he was head coach of the Poland men's national ice hockey team. He played three seasons in the National Hockey League for the Detroit Red Wings and the Pittsburgh Penguins. He also coached the New York Islanders, after serving as assistant coach for one season with the Hartford Whalers. On November 13, 2013, the Buffalo Sabres re-hired Nolan as interim head coach; he remained in the position until April 12, 2015.

Nolan has two sons who played in the NHL, Brandon Nolan, a Vancouver Canucks draft pick who last played for the American Hockey League's Albany River Rats, and Jordan Nolan, a winger currently playing for the Wilkes-Barre/Scranton Penguins.

He is a member of the Ojibwe tribe, a First Nations people.

Playing career
As a player, he played left-wing for the Ontario Hockey Association's Sault Ste. Marie Greyhounds, the Kansas City Red Wings of the Central Hockey League, and the Adirondack Red Wings, Rochester Americans and Baltimore Skipjacks of the American Hockey League. He also played for the Pittsburgh Penguins and the Detroit Red Wings of the National Hockey League from early to mid-1980s.

Coaching career

Ontario Hockey League
Nolan became head coach of the Sault Ste. Marie Greyhounds in 1988, as a mid-season replacement and coached there until the end of the 1994 season. Nolan led the Greyhounds to the three consecutive Memorial Cup tournament berths, winning the Canadian national junior championship in 1993.

Buffalo Sabres, 1995–1997
Nolan was hired before the 1994–95 NHL season as an assistant coach by the Hartford Whalers for one season before accepting the position of head coach of the NHL's Buffalo Sabres where he had his greatest success. In his second season in Buffalo, he led the team to a strong regular season, culminating in the Northeast Division title. He was rewarded with the Jack Adams Award as the league's top coach.

However his relationships with goaltender Dominik Hašek and general manager John Muckler were strained. The regular season success was all overshadowed by what took place during the playoffs. Tensions between Nolan and Hašek had been low for most of the season. However, Hašek abruptly left the game being scored upon in game three of the first-round against the Ottawa Senators, forcing backup Steve Shields to step in. Hašek claimed he felt his knee pop, and the team doctor pronounced him day-to-day. Buffalo News columnist Jim Kelley wrote a column that night for the next day's newspaper that detailed the day's events, which irked Hašek. After the Senators won game five, Hašek came out of the Sabres' training room and physically attacked Kelley, tearing his shirt. Despite issuing an apology, things went downhill afterwards. Shields starred as the Sabres rallied to win the series against Ottawa. But before the next series against the Philadelphia Flyers, the NHL announced that Hašek had been suspended for three games for the altercation with Kelley. Hašek was set to return in game four with the team down 3–0, but told the Sabres' coaching staff after the pregame skate that he felt a twinge in his knee and left the ice. Shields turned in another season-saving performance as Buffalo staved off the almost inevitable sweeping elimination with a win. Again before the fifth game, Hašek declared himself unfit to play and Buffalo lost 6–3, losing the series in five games.

Hašek, who sided with Muckler, stated in an interview during 1997 NHL Awards Ceremony that "it would be better for me if he (Nolan) did not return." But Hašek initially made his dislike for Nolan known first on a local radio station morning show, "Norton In The Morning" on 97 Rock WGRF-FM, Buffalo, NY a few days after the Sabres were eliminated from the playoffs during his (Hasek's) weekly call-in show. Audio of Hašek saying he would not return to the Sabres if Nolan was coach the following year was immediately  picked up by every local news outlet, as well as all the major sports TV channels (ESPN, Fox). Hašek's comments went viral and became national news within just a few hours.

Muckler, fresh off of being voted the NHL's 1996–97 Executive of the Year, was the first casualty of this toxic situation and was fired prior to the 1997–98 season. New general manager Darcy Regier was given the option to choose his own coach. Rather than fire Nolan, whose two-year contract had just expired, Regier offered him a one-year extension, reportedly for $500,000. After such a successful 1996–97 season working with a "blue collar" team full of grinders and with only one star, Hašek, and receiving Coach of the Year honors, Nolan found the offer insulting and rejected it. Regier then pulled the contract off the table and did not offer another one, and named Lindy Ruff as the Sabres' new coach. This capped a bizarre situation in which the Sabres had parted with both their general manager and head coach, despite both being honored for the 1996–97 season as the best at their positions.

Post-Sabres career
Following his departure from Buffalo, Nolan was offered NHL coaching jobs in 1997 by the Tampa Bay Lightning (head coach) and in 1998 by the New York Islanders (assistant coach). Nolan declined both offers. Nolan was not offered an NHL coaching job again until May 2006, a span of eight years, and speculation as to why ranged from outright racism to a perceived fear that Nolan is a "GM killer" based on his acrimonious working relationship with former boss Muckler.

In 2003, Nolan was in talks to become the coach for the Toronto Toros of the new World Hockey Association, but it never got past talks, and the new WHA never formed. On 26 April 2005, he was hired as the coach and director of hockey operations for the Moncton Wildcats of the Quebec Major Junior Hockey League, who would host the 2006 Memorial Cup.

On December 16, 2005, Nolan was the victim of racial harassment during a Wildcats road game against the Chicoutimi Saguenéens. Fans in the stands shouted racial slurs at him and directed gestures such as the "tomahawk chop" and shooting a bow and arrow towards him as he stood behind the Moncton bench. Fans continued to taunt Nolan outside the arena after the game as he boarded the team bus with his players. The incident, he said later, left him shaking with anger and humiliation. The fans' behavior was condemned both by the QMJHL commissioner and Saguenéens management, the latter of which issued a formal apology to Nolan. As a result of the events that transpired in Chicoutimi, he referred to the Saguenay Region as being the "Alabama" of the QMJHL. After, he also had criticized the Gatineau Olympiques organisation for putting the 'Tomahawk Chop' song, which he said was racist. Because of the incident, the QMJHL launched a new anti-discrimination policy that covers everyone involved with the circuit, from team and league officials, to players and fans.

On December 25, 2005, it was reported that Nolan expressed interest in leaving Moncton to fill the New Jersey Devils coaching vacancy left by Larry Robinson. Despite this, the Devils never publicly mentioned Nolan as a potential replacement.

Nolan's Wildcats reached the Memorial Cup final only to lose to the Quebec Remparts coached by Patrick Roy on May 28, 2006.

Nolan travels widely during the summer, attending hockey camps in Northern Canada and working to inspire young native players to get an education and to pursue their dreams. Despite his hiring as head coach of the Isles, he still found time to attend a hockey camp in Whitehorse, Yukon in mid-July 2006.

New York Islanders, 2006–2008
When the New York Islanders fired head coach Steve Stirling in January 2006, team owner Charles Wang reportedly called Nolan to ask him to take over the team.  Nolan said that he felt a sense of responsibility toward Moncton and would not leave them mid-season.

On June 8, 2006, Wang dismissed interim coach Brad Shaw and announced the hiring of Nolan as the new head coach. New York Post hockey columnist Larry Brooks quickly criticized Wang for hiring Nolan at the same time that he hired a new general manager, Neil Smith, rather than allow Smith to hire a coach who would report to him. On July 18, Smith was fired as general manager and Garth Snow was named as his replacement.

In his first season with the Islanders in 2006–07, he led the team to a 92-point season and its first playoff berth since 2003–04. On April 20, 2007, Ted Nolan's 8th seeded Islanders fell in five games to his former team, the top-seeded Buffalo Sabres.

In his second season, Nolan led the Islanders to a record of 35–38–9 for 79 points. On November 3, 2007, Al Arbour returned at the request of Nolan, to coach his 1,500th game for the Islanders in a 3–2 win against the Pittsburgh Penguins. On July 14, 2008, Newsday reported that Ted Nolan was dismissed as Islanders coach by Islanders GM Garth Snow.

Rochester Americans, 2009–2011
On July 2, 2009, Nolan agreed to a one-year contract with the Rochester Americans to become their Vice President of Hockey Operations. He remained with the team through 2011, when the team was sold to Terrence Pegula and the Americans' front office was integrated into that of the Sabres'.

Latvia men's national ice hockey team
On August 3, 2011, Latvian Ice Hockey Federation announced that Nolan has agreed to become the head coach of Latvia men's national ice hockey team. He coached Latvia at the 2012 and 2013 IIHF World Championships, with Latvia finishing 10th and 11th respectively. In 2013 Latvia qualified for the 2014 Winter Olympics under Nolan's leadership.

At the Sochi Games, Latvia finished last in its group during the round robin. They then upset favoured Switzerland in the qualification playoffs 3–1. Advancing to the quarterfinals, Latvia lost a hard-fought match to defending Olympic champions Team Canada 2–1, being the last team to score against the Canadians who went on to shutout their next two opponents to defend their gold medal. It was Latvia's best-ever Olympic result as they finished eighth overall.

Return to the Buffalo Sabres, 2013–2015
On November 13, 2013, Nolan was named the interim head coach by the Buffalo Sabres, following the firing of both head coach Ron Rolston (who had replaced the fired Lindy Ruff back on February 20, 2013) and general manager Darcy Regier (whose first move as GM had been to oust Nolan as Sabres head coach in 1997). Nolan was brought in by Pat LaFontaine, who also joined the team as president of hockey operations but left three months later.

Despite a relatively poor on-ice record, Tim Murray, Regier's replacement as general manager, expressed interest in keeping Nolan as permanent head coach. Nolan signed a three-year contract extension on March 31, 2014. However, on April 12, 2015, Murray fired Nolan and his assistants, citing both a last place finish in the standings and a "decent" but not "great" working relationship with Nolan, whom Murray had not hired.

Poland men's national ice hockey team
Nolan started coaching the Polish national team in 2017. The team played in the 2018 IIHF World Championship Division I A and were relegated to Division I B. He left his position as Poland's coach shortly thereafter.

Awards and achievements
Ted Nolan's success in hockey didn't come easily to him. He had fought through poverty growing up on the Garden River reserve, in a small house that had no running hot water or electricity. He loved hockey as a kid so much that he would build fires around the well to free up the frozen pump, then he would carry the pail of water to his little rink.

Ted Nolan was chosen as a role model in the national native alcohol drug and abuse program in 1986. Nolan was also chosen for the Kiwanis Citizen of the year in 1991, and is an active member of the Aboriginal community.

 1996–97 – Jack Adams Award Winner
 1994 - National Aboriginal Achievement Award, now the Indspire Awards

Coaching statistics
Note: Head coaching statistics only.

NHL

Junior leagues

 – Denotes championship season

Career statistics

Regular season and playoffs

Philanthropy 
In 2004, Nolan founded The Ted Nolan Foundation, which awards an annual scholarship in honor of his mother, the Rose Nolan Memorial scholarship. This scholarship awards $5,000 to female First Nations students who achieve their education and accomplish their sport goals while maintaining strong community involvement. In 2013, Nolan and his two sons created the 3|NOLANS First Nation Hockey School as a way to offer a hockey skills camp to youth, while at the same time teaching the value of living an active healthy lifestyle. This 5-day hockey camp is for both girls and boys between the ages of 7–15 years old, and was developed to help First Nation youth develop their hockey skills while teaching First Nation youth across the country to be positive role models within their communities.

See also 
Notable Aboriginal people of Canada

References

External links
 

1958 births
Living people
Adirondack Red Wings players
Baltimore Skipjacks players
Buffalo Sabres coaches
Canadian ice hockey coaches
Canadian ice hockey left wingers
Detroit Red Wings draft picks
Detroit Red Wings players
First Nations sportspeople
Hartford Whalers coaches
Ice hockey people from Ontario
Indspire Awards
Jack Adams Award winners
Kansas City Red Wings players
Latvia men's national ice hockey team coaches
Kenora Thistles players
Members of the Order of Ontario
Moncton Wildcats coaches
New York Islanders coaches
Ojibwe people
People from Algoma District
Pittsburgh Penguins players
Poland men's national ice hockey team coaches
Rochester Americans players
Sault Ste. Marie Greyhounds coaches
Sault Ste. Marie Greyhounds players